"Channel 42" is a song by Canadian electronic music producer Deadmau5 and American DJ Wolfgang Gartner. It was released as the fourth single from Deadmau5's sixth studio album Album Title Goes Here.

Background and release
In February 2012, two work-in-progress versions of the song were uploaded to Zimmerman's SoundCloud account. They were titled "Channel 41" and "Channel 42" respectively. "Channel 42" was first played during a live performance in Oslo, Norway in May 2012. On September 25, 2012, "Channel 42" appeared as the second track on the 2012 album Album Title Goes Here. It was released with three remixes as an EP on February 12, 2013 through Zimmerman's label mau5trap.  

A follow-up version, titled "Channel 43", was announced on Zimmerman's Twitter on December 21, 2020, and released on January 7, 2021 as a single through mau5trap.

Music video
A music video was uploaded to Zimmerman's YouTube account along with the release of the remix EP on February 12, 2013. The video was recorded during the November 28, 2012 performance in London, UK promoting the Nokia Lumia 920.

Track listing

References

2013 singles
Deadmau5 songs
Songs written by Deadmau5
2012 songs
Ultra Music singles
Wolfgang Gartner songs